Don Warrington MBE (born Donald Williams, 23 May 1951) is a Trinidadian-born British actor. He is best known for playing Philip Smith in the ITV sitcom Rising Damp (1974–78), and Commissioner Selwyn Patterson in the BBC detective series Death in Paradise (2011–present).

He was appointed Member of the Order of the British Empire (MBE) in the 2008 Birthday Honours.

Early life
Warrington was born in Trinidad, but moved to England with his mother and brother at a young age, while his sister stayed in Trinidad. He was brought up in Newcastle upon Tyne. His father, Basil Kydd, was a Trinidadian politician who died in 1958.

Warrington attended Harris College (now the University of Central Lancashire) and trained as an actor at the Drama Centre London. As there was already an actor called Don Williams when he joined Equity, he took the stage surname "Warrington" after Warrington Road, the street he grew up on. He started acting in repertory theatre at the age of 17.

Career

Television and film
Warrington is best known for playing Philip Smith in Rising Damp, from 1974 to 1978, alongside Leonard Rossiter, Richard Beckinsale, and Frances de la Tour. Warrington also appeared as series regular in the crime drama C.A.T.S. Eyes, as government contact Nigel Beaumont (1985–1987); in Impact Earth (2007) playing General Harris; and in New Street Law as Judge Ken Winyard.

In 1993 Warrington played television reporter Graham Gaunt in To Play the King, the second part of the BBC's House of Cards trilogy.

He has had smaller roles in many programmes including Red Dwarf, Lovejoy, Manchild, and Diamond Geezer. Warrington portrayed the founder of Time Lord society, Rassilon, in several Doctor Who audio plays, and also appeared as the President of an alternative-universe Great Britain in the Doctor Who episode "Rise of the Cybermen" (2006). Soon after, he recorded an abridged audio book of the Doctor Who novel The Art of Destruction by Stephen Cole.

He is one of the interviewees on the BBC 2 series Grumpy Old Men, and he appears in a series of Kenco coffee advertisements in the United Kingdom in which he plays an African coffee plantation owner. He regularly provides voice-overs for both BBC television and radio.

Warrington has also appeared in BBC1 sitcom The Crouches, which aired from 9 September 2003 until 2005. He played Bailey, who was Roly's boss at a London Underground station in South London. Roly was played by Robbie Gee. Warrington played the role of the Hospital Chaplain in Casualty, assuming the role of Trevor. He also starred in the 2010 film It's a Wonderful Afterlife.
He also appeared in Grange Hill as Mr Peters, the father of pupil Lauren Peters.

He provided voiceover links, reading out the various methods of contacting the show on the Chris Evans Breakfast Show on BBC Radio 2, which was broadcast from 11 January 2010.

Since 2011, Warrington has played Commissioner Selwyn Patterson in the BBC show Death in Paradise.

He also appeared as jazz musician Frederick J. Louden in a BBC radio production of The Devil's Music, written by Alan Plater. In 2011, Warrington played the father of a suspected terrorist in the last series of the BBC drama Waking the Dead.

In 2012, he played master of the college Marcus Harding in “Generation of Vipers”, S6:E2 of Lewis.

His film roles included the movie version of Rising Damp (1980), the Kenny Everett horror comedy Bloodbath at the House of Death (1983), The Lion of Africa (1987),  Kenneth Branagh's Hamlet (1996), Peter Greenaway's 8½ Women (1999) and the horror film Lighthouse (1999).

Theatre
Warrington is also a theatre actor and has performed with the National Theatre, the Royal Shakespeare Company, Bristol Old Vic and the Royal Exchange, Manchester.

In 2012–13, he toured with Gwen Taylor in a new stage version of Driving Miss Daisy.

In 2013, Warrington played the lead role of Joe Keller, in Talawa Theatre Company's all-black revival of Arthur Miller's tragedy All My Sons at the Royal Exchange, Manchester, directed by Michael Buffong – a production that The Guardian reviewer called "flawless", giving it a five-star rating.

Warrington performed in the lead role of King Lear in a 2016 Talawa Theatre Company and Royal Exchange, Manchester production. Mark Shenton wrote in The Stage that "Warrington seizes and owns it with magnetic, majestic power" as "one of many virtues in this outstanding production." Claire Allfree in The Telegraph wrote: "Lear is the Everest of roles, and Don Warrington ... ascends the cliff face with magnificent authority. He rages around his daughters like a hulking thunder cloud in human form, not just the incarnation of absolute rule but of something more ancient and of the earth."

Warrington appeared as George in David Mamet's Glengarry Glenn Ross between October 2017 and February 2018 at the Playhouse Theatre alongside Christian Slater, Robert Glenister, Kris Marshall and Daniel Ryan.

He appeared as the central protagonist Willy Loman in Arthur Miller's Death of a Salesman at the Royal Exchange Theatre from October to November 2018.

Strictly Come Dancing
In 2008, Warrington competed in the sixth series of Strictly Come Dancing, partnered with the 2005 and 2006 British National Champion in Latin American dance, Lilia Kopylova. After Week 4, Warrington was joint seventh out of the remaining 12 contestants with an average of 24.5 points. In Week 5, he was eliminated, having lost the dance-off against Heather Small, with the first three judges all voting for Small over Warrington.

He joined the show to step out of his comfort zone, and he appreciated the opportunity to learn to dance.

Selected television roles

Footnotes

External links

 Biography at Rigsby Online – Official Rising Damp web site

 West Yorkshire Playhouse "Interview with Don Warrington".

1951 births
Living people
20th-century British male actors
21st-century British male actors
Alumni of the Drama Centre London
Alumni of the University of Central Lancashire
Black British male actors
English male television actors
English people of Trinidad and Tobago descent
Members of the Order of the British Empire
Male actors from Newcastle upon Tyne
Trinidad and Tobago emigrants to the United Kingdom
Trinidad and Tobago male stage actors
Trinidad and Tobago male television actors